Bungawalbin State Forest is a 1200 hectare forest to the east of Braemar State Forest and the Summerland Way. It is about 25 kilometres south west of Coraki in New South Wales.

Notes 

New South Wales state forests